Eurostar is a satellite bus made by Airbus Defence and Space (formerly Astrium, and before 1994, British Aerospace, and Matra Marconi Space (the former Marconi Space having been merged with Matra's former "Matra Espace" division) which has been used for a series of spacecraft providing telecommunications services in geosynchronous orbit (GEO). More than 70 Eurostar satellites have been ordered to date, of which more than 55 have been successfully launched since October 1990 and have proven highly reliable in operational service. In December 2013, the Eurostar satellites accumulated 500 years of successful operations in orbit.
The Eurostar spacecraft series is designed for a variety of telecommunications needs including fixed services and broadcast, mobile services, broadband and secured communications.

Development
Eurostar was designed in the mid 1980s jointly by Matra Marconi Space and BAe (now integrated within Airbus Defence and Space) to Inmarsat specifications, for a market which at the time had a design envelope of 1.8-2.5 Tons on the proposed launch vehicles (STS PAM D2 and Ariane 4). Satellite payload power was from 1300 to 2600 W. This was the first commercial satellite to have a digital avionics system modular in concept. With this system architecture, all key satellite parameters are in software, which permits mission specific requirements to be implemented without hardware changes. The initial satellite structure and configuration designed to early requirements had significant growth potential, which subsequently allowed the payload capability (mass and power) to be more than quadrupled between 1987 and 1992, with a minimum of re qualification. Airbus DS has since developed further the product line in a staged process which mainly increases the satellite power and propulsion capability and real estate for accommodation of equipment and antennas. The overall configuration of Eurostar satellites has essentially not changed in 20 years through the successive generations Eurostar E1000, E2000, E2000+ and E3000. They have just become larger, more powerful, with implementation costs reduced through longer orbit manoeuvring lifetime, and more efficient and powerful payloads. Nowadays the Eurostar E3000 series has been considerably enhanced and updated with the latest technologies, still maintaining the basic proven configuration. A new version E3000e introduced in 2014 uses electric propulsion for orbit raising.

Range

Eurostar E1000
The original Eurostar E1000 satellite was designed for the Inmarsat-2 fleet requirements by an international team led by Matra Marconi Space and British Aerospace Space Systems (BAe Dynamics), the former of which would ultimately acquire BAe Dynamics to eventually become Astrium and eventually merge with Airbus Military to form the present Airbus Defence and Space. Three-axis stabilized, and designed for a 10-year service life, the Inmarsat-2 had 4 (+2) L-band transponders and 1 (+1) C-Band transponders. Subsequently, the spacecraft also came with different payload power options ranging from 1300 W to 3000 W. This degree of customization was the result of a highly modular design that would carry over onto the upgraded variants.

A total of four satellites based on the E1000 bus have been built and launched, all of which were for Inmarsat.

Eurostar E2000/E2000+

The Eurostar E2000, which debuted with France Telecom as the launch customer in December 1991, was a larger and more capable upgrade of the E1000. It was developed from a set of requirements by the French Space Agency (CNES) and the French Ministry of Armed Forces via the Directorate-General for Armaments (DGA). The DGA had decided to repartner with CNES in order to add X-Band capabilities to the mission to enable the creation of their Syracuse II military ground-based telecommunications network, and to replace and enhance the role of the Syracuse I systems aboard the aging Telecom-1 fleet. The first of the satellites to be launched would be the Telecom 2A. Each of the four Telecom-2 satellites in the constellation had 10 x C-Band transponders, 14 x Ku-Band transponders and 5 x X-Band transponders. The E2000’s operational/maneuverability life varied by customer, but ranged from 7 to 10 years. The E2000’s main power comes from two swivelling solar arrays, with later models capable of producing up to 3600W per array, or 6200 W total with an optional array spanning .

The E2000+ satellite bus offered a series of significant upgrades, in addition to being slightly larger than the E2000. Upgrades included:
Increased efficiency in its ability to operate over 40 transponders
Increased maximum launch mass of up to  
Increased payload power up to 
Capability to carry up to 48 high powered amplifiers in addition to large multiple antenna configurations
Increased maneuverability life to 15 years
Integration of CCSDS telemetry and telecommand protocols.

The first E2000+ customer was Eutelsat's Hot Bird 2. At least 23 E2000 and E2000+ satellite busses were built, with a total of 22 launches.

Eurostar E3000 & Eurostar Neo

The Eurostar E3000 satellite bus was first launched in 2004 with Eutesat's Eutelsat W3A payload. Building upon the idea of modularity, the satellite itself can be built with several modules to serve different missions, all based around a common service module, communications module with 1,2, or 3 floors, a chemical or chemical-electric propulsion module, and scalable payload power options. Satellite power can be up to 16 kW (16,000 W) stored in either NiH2 or Lithium-Ion batteries. SES-12 for SES S.A. was the first customer for the E3000e in June 2018. At least 48 x E3000 and E3000e satellite busses had been built and launched by the end of 2018.

An improved model based on the E3000e called the Eurostar Neo was announced in 2017, offering electric, hybrid, or chemical propulsion, in addition to a scalable power range of 7 kW to 25 kW. In 2021 the first Eurostar Neo, Eutelsat Hot Bird 13F, started final integration.

As of 2020, a total of 84 Eurostar satellites had been ordered, with 6 E3000e satellites already in operation.

Modularity
The Eurostar satellite structures are modular with a separate Service-Propulsion module and Communications module.

Satellite orders

Eurostar-1000

Eurostar-2000

Eurostar-2000+

Eurostar-3000

Eurostar-3000EOR

Eurostar-3000GM

Eurostar-3000S

AstroBus-G

Eurostar-Neo

OneSat

References

Satellite buses
European space programmes